Stefan Liebich (born 30 December 1972) is a German politician, who served as a member of the Bundestag for the Democratic Socialist party The Left (DIE LINKE) between 2009 and 2021.

Life 
Liebich was born on 30 December 1972 in the East German city of Wismar and spent his childhood in Greifswald. In 1983, he moved with his family to Berlin. According to Liebich he was approached by the Stasi at the age of 13, who asked him if he could imagine working for them at a later time. After completing his Abitur in 1991, he graduated from Beuth University of Applied Sciences Berlin in business economics with a focus on information systems in 1995. Liebich is not religious.

Party 
In the GDR Stefan Liebich was a member of the marxist youth organisation FDJ. in 1990, on his 18th birthday, he joined the Party of Democratic Socialism (PDS).

In 1996 and 1998 the PDS in Marzahn elected him as chair of the district. In December 1999 he was elected co-chair of the PDS in Berlin. In 2001 he succeeded Petra Pau as chairman of the Berlin PDS and was re-elected in 2003.

In October 2005 Liebich announced that he would not run for chairman of the Berlin PDS again. He proposed Klaus Lederer as his successor. He wanted to focus on leading the PDS’s parliamentary group at the Berlin House of Representatives.

Political positions 

Liebich has been known to work for a red-red-green coalition on a federal level. Since 2009 he has hosted meetings between the party's MPs to find a common ground.

He represents the moderate, reformist wing of the party and advocates for an involvement of the party with government.

Member of Parliament

Berlin House of Representatives 
In 1995, 1999 and 2001 Stefan Liebich was voted into the Berlin House of Representatives for the Marzahn constituency. At the 2006 election he did not manage to win the direct mandate for Prenzlauer Berg and was subsequently elected via the PDS list.

From 2002 to 2006 he was the Chairman of the PDS parliamentary group.

Bundestag 
Liebich ran for office for the PDS in 2002 in Berlin-Mitte and in 2005 for The Left in Berlin-Pankow. Both times he lost to the candidates of the SPD. In 2009 Liebich managed to win the direct mandate in Pankow for the first time, beating the incumbent Wolfgang Thierse. At the 2013 and 2017 elections he also won the direct mandate.

He is the chairman of the parliamentary group of The Left in the Foreign Affairs committee of the Bundestag, currently he is the groups spokesperson for foreign policy.

In February 2020, Liebich said that he will not seek re-election to the Bundestag in the 2021 German federal election., and subsequently left office on 26 October 2021.

Publications 
 Stefan Liebich, Gerry Woop (Hrsg.): Linke Außenpolitik: Reformperspektiven. WeltTrends, Potsdam 2013,

External links 

 Biography
 Website
 twitter account

References 

Members of the Bundestag for Berlin
1972 births
Living people
Members of the Abgeordnetenhaus of Berlin
People from Wismar
People from Greifswald
German atheists
Members of the Bundestag 2017–2021
Members of the Bundestag 2013–2017
Members of the Bundestag 2009–2013
Members of the Bundestag for The Left